Launaea is a genus of flowering plants in the family Asteraceae.

 Species

References

External links
 Cichorieae Portal 

 
Asteraceae genera
Taxonomy articles created by Polbot